Saint-Estèphe may refer to:

 Saint-Estèphe, Gironde
 Saint-Estèphe, Dordogne
 Saint-Estèphe AOC, Appellation d'Origine Contrôlée for red wine in the Bordeaux region
 Saint Estephe (horse), a Thoroughbred racehorse